A-mutation is a metaphonic process supposed to have taken place in late Proto-Germanic (c. 200).

General description
In a-mutation, a short high vowel ( or ) was lowered when the following syllable contained a non-high vowel (or ). Thus, since the change was produced by other vowels besides */a/, the term a-mutation is something of a misnomer. It has also been called "a-umlaut", "a/o-umlaut", "velar umlaut" and, formerly, "Brechung". (This last was Grimm's term, but nowadays German Brechung, and its English equivalents breaking and fracture, are generally restricted in use to other unrelated sound-changes which later affected individual Germanic languages.)

 *hurną > Old English horn "horn"
 *wiraz > Old English wer "man"

The high vowel was not lowered, however, if  intervened between it and the following non-high vowel. An intervening nasal consonant followed by a consonant of any kind also blocked the process (and raised original  to ).

 *gulþą > Old English gold "gold"
 *gulþijaną > Old English gyldan "to gild" (with later i-mutation of u to y).

 *hundaz > Old English hund "dog" (German Hund)
 *swemmaną > *swimmaną > Old English swimman "to swim"

Dialectal variation
a-mutation is more evident in some Germanic languages than others. It is widely found in Old High German, less so in other West Germanic languages and Old Norse. a-mutation is less extensive in Old East Norse (the precursor of Danish and Swedish) than Old West Norse (spoken in Norway and its colonies). There is no trace of it at all in Gothic, where the distinction between the short high and mid vowels had become allophonic (Proto-Germanic  and  merged). Old Gutnish, at the eastern end of the territory where Old Norse evolved, resembles Gothic in this respect. But there is some suggestion that a-mutation may have been preserved in Crimean Gothic.

 Old English fugol, fugel : Old High German fogal "bird"
 Old Gutnish hult "copse, wood" : Old English, Old Icelandic holt

Variation is found within dialects too with doublets such as Old English spora : spura "spur",  :  "to spurn",  :  "to knock"; Old Icelandic  :  "bird", goð : guð "god",  :  "gold".

i > e
According to Campbell, a-mutation of i is limited in Old English to just three words: nest "nest", spec "bacon", and wer "man". More plentiful instances of  >  have been cited in other West Germanic languages, with Old High German showing the greatest number of examples, including doublets such as skif : skef "ship".

The mutation is rare in Old Norse, e.g. verr "man", heðan "hence", neðan "from below" in contrast to niðr "down(wards)" and perhaps jafn "even".

u > o
In some dialects, the change may be blocked in labial contexts. Other exceptions, in particular where there is disagreement between dialects, may be due to the word having once been a u-stem.

The effects of a-mutation are perhaps most noticeable in certain verb types, e.g. strong verbs of classes 2, 3 and 4, where o in the past participle alternates with u in the preterite plural. For example, Old English flogen "flown" < *fluganaz alternated with flugon "they flew" < *flugun. "woman". As can be seen from the examples above, a-mutation is also found in lexical alternations.

The diphthong 
Old Saxon breost "breast" vs. treuwa "fidelity". Old Icelandic djúpr.

Effects of a single nasal consonant
The effect occurs in other West Germanic languages, though more erratically, and sometimes in Old Norse.

 Old Norse nema, Old High German neman : Old Frisian nima, nema, Old Saxon niman, neman : Old English niman "to take"
 Old High German gi-noman, Old Frisian nomen : Old Norse numinn, Old English numen, Old Saxon numan  "taken" (past participle)
 Old High German gomo "man", Old Frisian gomo : Old Norse gumi,  Old English guma, Old Saxon gumo
a-mutation was also sometimes blocked before single , again with much variation among languages.

 Old Saxon honig, -eg, Old High German  : Old English  (for older -æg), Old Frisian hunig, Old Norse hunang

Alternative ideas
A number of scholars have questioned the traditional model of Proto-Germanic a-mutation in whole or in part. Cercignani, on the other hand, argued that "no 'umlaut' phenomena can be assumed for Proto-Germanic", preferring to ascribe these changes to "the prehistory of the individual languages."

Notes

References
 Campbell, A. (1959). Old English Grammar. Oxford University Press. .
 Cercignani, Fausto (1980). "Early 'umlaut' phenomena in the Germanic languages", Language 56:1, pp. 126–136.
 Collitz, Hermann (1918), "Early Germanic vocalism", Modern Language Notes 33:6, pp. 321–333.
 Gordon, E. V. (1957). An Introduction to Old Norse. Second Edition revised by A. R. Taylor. Oxford University Press. .
 Grønvik, Ottar (1983). Die dialektgeographische Stellung des Krimgotischen und die krimgotische cantilena. Oslo, Universitetsforlaget.
 Kock, Axel (1898). "Der a-umlaut und der Wechsel der endvocale a: i(e) in den altnordischen sprachen",  Beiträge zur Geschichte der deutschen Sprache und Literatur 23, pp. 484–554.
 Kock, Axel (1890). "Några bidrag till fornnordisk grammatik", Arkiv för nordisk filologi. Ny följd. Andra bandet.
 Kluge (1889). "Vorgeschichte der Altgermanichsen Dialekte", Grundriss der germanischen Philologie, herausgegeben von Herman Paul. Strassburg, Trübner.
 Lloyd L. (1966). "Is there an a-umlaut of i in Germanic?", Language 42:4, pp. 738–745.
 Sturtevant (1956). "The a-umlaut of the radical vowel i in Old Norse monosyllabic stems", Modern Language Notes 71:3, pp. 194–200.
 Wright (1917). Grammar of the Gothic Language. Oxford University Press.

See also
 I-mutation
 Germanic umlaut
 Vowel harmony

Sound laws
Vowel shifts
Germanic languages